Mount Cook National Park may refer to the following:

Mount Cook National Park, Australia
Aoraki / Mount Cook National Park, New Zealand